The men's light welterweight event was part of the boxing programme at the 1988 Summer Olympics. The weight class allowed boxers of up to 63.5 kilograms to compete. The competition was held from 19 September to 2 October 1988. 45 boxers from 45 nations competed. 31-year-old Vyacheslav Yanovskiy won the gold medal.

Medalists

Results
The following boxers took part in the event:

First round
 Lars Myrberg (SWE) def. Handhal al-Harithy (OMA), RSC-1
 Ludovic Proto (FRA) def. Mpuco Makama (SUA), walk-over
 Mark Elliott (GBR) def. Tomas Ruíz (ESP), 5:0
 Vyacheslav Yanovskiy (URS) def. Søren Søndergaard (DEN), RSC-2
 Rashi Ali Hadj Matumla (TNZ) def. Dieudonne Kouassi (IVC), RSC-1
 Lyton Mphande (MLW) def. Ihapat Singh Bhujel (NEP), 5:0
 Khalid Rahilou (MAR) def. Avaavau Avaavau (SAM), RSC-3
 Anthony Mwamba (ZAM) def. Kunihiro Miura (JPN), 5:0
 Anoumou Aguiar (TOG) def. Jonas Bade (PNG), DSQ-2
 Vukašin Dobrašinović (YUG) def. Borislav Abadzhiev (BUL), 3:2
 Adrian Carew (GUY) def. Bilal el-Masri (LIB), 5:0
 Lórant Szabó (HUN) def. Víctor Pérez (PUR), 3:2
 Reiner Gies (FRG) def. Basil Maelagi (SIS), walk-over
 David Kamau (KEN) def. Abidnasir Shahab (JRD), RSC-1
 Martin Ndongo-Ebanga (CMR) def. Hubert Wester (ARU), RSC-1
 Sodnomdarjaagiin Altansükh (MGL) def. Pravit Suwanwichit (THA), 3:2
 Dan Odindo (UGA) def. Desiré Ollo (GAB), walk-over

Second round
 Grahame Cheney (AUS) def. Miguel González (PAR), RSC-2
 Ike Quartey (GHA) def. José Saizozema (DOM), 5:0
 Todd Foster (USA) def. Khalid Rahilou (MAR), KO-2
 Chun Jil-Chun (KOR) def. Liasu Braimoh (NGA), RSC-3
 Duke Chinyadza (ZIM) def. Andrzej Możdżeń (POL), 3:2
 Humberto Rodriguez (MEX) def. Apete Temo (FIJ), RSC-2
 Howard Grant (CAN) def. Andreas Otto (GDR), RSC-1
 Lars Myrberg (SWE) def. Ahmed Khanji (SYR), 4:1
 Ludovic Proto (FRA) def. Mark Elliott (GBR), RSC-1
 Vyacheslav Yanovskiy (URS) def. Rashid Matumla (TNZ), RSC-3
 Anthony Mwamba (ZAM) def. Anoumou Aguiar (TOG), RSC-1
 Adrian Carew (GUY) def. Vukašin Dobrašinović (YUG), 4:1
 Reiner Gies (FRG) def. Lórant Szabó (HUN), 5:0
 David Kamau (KEN) def. Martin Ndongo-Ebanga (CMR), 5:0
 Sodnomdarjaagiin Altansükh (MGL) def. Dan Odindo (UGA), RSC-2

Third round
 Grahame Cheney (AUS) def. Ike Quartey (GHA), 5:0
 Todd Foster (USA) def. Chun Jil-Chun (KOR), KO-2
 Humberto Rodriguez (MEX) def. Duke Chinyadza (ZIM), KO-1
 Lars Myrberg (SWE) def. Howard Grant (CAN), 4:1
 Vyacheslav Yanovskiy (URS) def. Ludovic Proto (FRA), 5:0
 Anthony Mwamba (ZAM) def. Lyton Mphande (MLW), KO-2
 Reiner Gies (FRG) def. Adrian Carew (GUY), 3:2
 Sodnomdarjaagiin Altansükh (MGL) def. David Kamau (KEN), 5:0

Quarterfinals
 Grahame Cheney (AUS) def. Todd Foster (USA), 3:2
 Lars Myrberg (SWE) def. Humberto Rodriguez (MEX), KO-1
 Vyacheslav Yanovskiy (URS) def. Anthony Mwamba (ZAM), 5:0
 Reiner Gies (FRG) def. Sodnomdarjaagiin Altansükh (MGL), 4:1

Semifinals
 Grahame Cheney (AUS) def. Lars Myrberg (SWE), 5:0
 Vyacheslav Yanovskiy (URS) def. Reiner Gies (FRG), KO-1

Final
 Vyacheslav Yanovskiy (URS) def. Grahame Cheney (AUS), 5:0

References

Light Welterweight